Mezivrata is a hill in the Vlašim Uplands in the Czech Republic. It is located in the municipal territory of Neustupov in Benešov District in the Central Bohemian Region. It is the highest point of the district and the second highest peak of the Vlašim Uplands.

Facilities
It was built in 1989. There is also a former measuring tower.

References

Mountains and hills of the Czech Republic
Benešov District